William Doune was a 14th-century English priest.

Doune was ordained in 1342. He was Archdeacon of Leicester from 1354 until his death in 1361. He was a noted Pluralist. In 1860 his will was discovered, and it shows a man efficient in collecting his dues but whose conscience sometimes troubled him.

Notes

See also
 Diocese of Lincoln
 Diocese of Peterborough
 Diocese of Leicester
 Archdeacon of Leicester

Archdeacons of Leicester
14th-century English people
1361 deaths